Mirandola is a city and comune of Emilia-Romagna, Italy, in the Province of Modena,  northeast of the provincial capital by railway.

History 
Mirandola originated as a Renaissance city-fortress. For four centuries it was the seat of an independent principality (first a county, then a duchy), a possession of the Pico family, whose most outstanding member was the polymath Giovanni Pico della Mirandola (1463–94). It was besieged two times: in 1510 by Pope Julius II and in 1551 by Pope Julius III.

It was acquired by the Duchy of Modena in 1710. The city started to decay after the castle of Mirandola was partially destroyed in 1714.

On 29 May 2012, a powerful earthquake hit the Mirandola area. It killed at least 17 people and collapsed churches and factories. Also 200 were injured. The 5.8 magnitude quake left 14,000 people homeless.

Main sights 
 The Palazzo del Comune is a 1468 edifice of Gothic style (largely restored in the 19th century), with the portraits of the Pico and other artworks, including an Adoration of the Magi once attributed to Palma il Giovane. 
The castle of the Pico family has been recently restored and it is now open to the public. 
 Palazzo della Ragione, in late Gothic style.
 Palazzo Bergomi (15th century)
 The Church of Santa Maria Maggiore (known also as Duomo or Collegiata), dating from the end of the 15th century, has been restored. 
 The Church of St. Francis is a fine Gothic church. It houses the tombs of the Pico family, including that of Prendiparte Pico (14th century). Collapsed during the second of the 2012 Emilia earthquakes.
 The Baroque Church of Jesus (1690).
 Teatro Nuovo, opera house and theater built in 1905 and renovated in 2005.
 Stadio Libero Lolli, sport venue

Notable people 
 

Achille Salata, 19th-century sculptor

Twin cities 
  Ostfildern, Germany
  Villejuif, France

Sources

External links 
 Official website 

 
Cities and towns in Emilia-Romagna
Castles in Italy